Franziska Nisch (18 September 1882 – 8 May 1913) was a German Roman Catholic nun. Nisch was also a member of the Sisters of Mercy of the Holy Cross of Ingenbohl and assumed the new name of "Ulrika" after she had become a nun. She performed a wide range of tasks to cater to the needs of those who needed help.

Pope John Paul II presided over her beatification on 1 November 1987 after the recognition of a healing that was attributed to her as a miracle.

Life
Franziska Nisch was born on 18 September 1882 as the first of eleven children. Her parents were poor. Following her education she had no choice but to support her parents and siblings and also donated her services to other families.

She was struck with a severe ailment in 1903 and was admitted to a hospital where she met a religious order. After some exposure to them her feeling that she should join religious life grew and she decided that her true mission was to become a professed religious. She was allowed admittance into the order and she assumed the name of "Ulrika" after she made her formal profession on 24 April 1907. Nisch was sent to the kitchens of a hospital to work and later in the house of St. Vincent of Baden-Baden where she remained until August 1912.

Nisch died in 1913 after she had contracted tuberculosis.

Beatification

The beatification process commenced in Freiburg in a local diocesan tribunal on 24 November 1952 and concluded on 10 August 1953. This occurred despite the fact that the cause did not open on a formal level until 31 July 1981 which granted her the title Servant of God. The Positio – documentation on her life and accounts of her virtue – was compiled after the diocesan process and was submitted to the Congregation for the Causes of Saints in Rome in 1983. Pope John Paul II approved her life of heroic virtue and declared her to be Venerable on 14 December 1984.

The diocesan tribunal for a miracle attributed to her intercession opened on 17 December 1979 and it concluded its investigation on 4 June 1981; it received its formal ratification to confirm the process was valid on 18 November 1983. John Paul II approved the miracle at the beginning of 1987 and beatified her on 1 November 1987.

References

External links
Hagiography Circle
Franziska Nisch

1882 births
1913 deaths
People from Biberach (district)
19th-century venerated Christians
20th-century venerated Christians
20th-century deaths from tuberculosis
Beatifications by Pope John Paul II
German beatified people
20th-century German Roman Catholic nuns
Venerated Catholics by Pope John Paul II
Tuberculosis deaths in Germany